Willis David Francis (born 26 July 1985) is an English footballer who played as a midfielder in the Football League.

Career
Francis came through the youth team of Notts County and made his debut for the club whilst he was a third year apprentice, in a 1–1 draw with Blackpool on 30 November 2002. In February 2004 he joined Grantham Town on work experience. He was released by County in March 2004 and rejoined Grantham for the remainder of the 2003–04 season, and was named Player of the Year in the following season for the club. In November 2005 he joined Southern League Premier Division side Rugby Town on a free transfer and made his debut in the same month away at Northwood. He missed part of the 2005–06 season due to a family illness. His first goal for the club came in the 2006–07 season against Aylesbury United in December. He left in September 2007 to join Northern Counties East League side Glapwell, but rejoined Rugby in January 2008 following Rod Brown's appointment. However, in March 2008 he was released from the club having failing to nail down a regular spot in the team.

References

External links

1985 births
Living people
Footballers from Nottingham
English footballers
Association football midfielders
Notts County F.C. players
Grantham Town F.C. players
Rugby Town F.C. players
Glapwell F.C. players
Carlton Town F.C. players
Hucknall Town F.C. players
Rainworth Miners Welfare F.C. players
Arnold Town F.C. players
English Football League players
Southern Football League players